The Gudrun class is a series of 6 container ships built for Maersk Line. The ships were built by Odense Steel Shipyard in Denmark and have a maximum theoretical capacity of around 11,078 twenty-foot equivalent units (TEU).

List of ships

See also 

 Maersk Triple E-class container ship
 Maersk E-class container ship
 Maersk H-class container ship
 Maersk Edinburgh-class container ship
 Maersk M-class container ship

References 

Container ship classes
Ships of the Maersk Line